The men's large hill individual ski jumping competition for the 1972 Winter Olympics was held in Okurayama Ski Jump Stadium. It occurred on 11 February.

In the competition on the Okurayama jumping hill, conditions were "variable and unfair" according to a Norwegian account of the 1972 Games published in 2006, and the result is described as "the greatest surprise of all time on the jumping hill". In the first run, the 19-year-old Zakopane mechanic Wojciech Fortuna completed a leap of 111 metres, while Manfred Wolf of East Germany was runner-up after the first run having jumped 107 metres. Jiří Raška, Gariy Napalkov and Tauno Käyhkö, all counted among the favourites according to Jorsett's account, were all more than 12 metres behind, Yukio Kasaya, who won on the normal hill, landed on 90 metres, and Ingolf Mork, the 1972 Four Hills Tournament winner, touched down on 88 metres.

Fortuna's second jump was a more modest 87.5 metres; still, the tenths of a point remained on his side. Again according to Jorsett, Steiner (103 metres), Schmidt (101 metres) and Käyhkö (100.5 metres) got lucky with the wind in the second run, but all finished within 0.7 points of Fortuna. This was the smallest margin between first and fourth to date.

Pudgar's eighth place was the best placing by a Yugoslav at the Winter Olympics ski jumping until Matjaž Debelak won bronze at the 1988 Winter Olympic Games.

Results

References

Ski jumping at the 1972 Winter Olympics